William Thomas Newton (8 February 1875 – 6 April 1941) was an  Australian rules footballer who played with St Kilda in the Victorian Football League (VFL).

Football
Cleared from Richmond (VFA) to St. Klda (VFA) in May 1896,  he played in St Kilda's first three VFL competition matches in 1897.

Family
The son of James Newton, and Harriett Ann Newton, née Oakley, William Thomas Newton was born at Prahran on 8 February 1875. He married Ellen Williams in 1900. He died at Bairnsdale, Victoria on 6 April 1941.

Footnotes

References

External links 

1875 births
1941 deaths
Australian rules footballers from Victoria (Australia)
St Kilda Football Club players